Local News on Cable, or LNC5, was a joint venture between WVEC-TV (the local ABC affiliate), Cox Communications, and The Virginian-Pilot. LNC5 was owned by the Belo Corporation. Launched on February 24, 1997 as LNC4 on Cox Cable channel 4.  It later moved to channel 5 after the launch of independent station WSKY-TV).  LNC5 was available only on Cox Communications in the Hampton Roads area of Virginia.

LNC5 aired WVEC's live newscasts and rebroadcasts them throughout the day. LNC occasionally aired live broadcasts of major events in the Hampton Roads area, i.e. arrivals of military members.

In December 2010, Cox issued a statement to customers that LNC5 will cease operation after December 31, 2010. A few weeks after LNC5 ended programming, the channel space was used by Cox Communications to give Cox customers a "preview" of channels from their Advanced TV lineup, such as DIY Network and Bloomberg. This lasted from March–July 2011, previewing each channel for 2–3 weeks. Currently, channel 5 broadcasts the national feed of Univision.

10 p.m. newscast
From LNC's debut until January 30, 2009, WVEC produced a half-hour 10 p.m. newscast that aired on LNC Monday through Friday, "Pilot 13 News." The newscast was canceled due to low ratings.

References

External links 
 LNC information from The Virginian-Pilot (archived April 1999 from archive.org)
 WVEC-TV
 The Virginian-Pilot

Television stations in Virginia
24-hour television news channels in the United States
Television channels and stations established in 1997
Television channels and stations disestablished in 2010
Defunct local cable stations in the United States
Defunct mass media in Virginia
1997 establishments in Virginia
2010 disestablishments in Virginia
Television stations in Hampton Roads